The 148th Infantry Regiment is an Ohio Army National Guard parent regiment under the U.S. Army Regimental System, with headquarters at Walbridge, Ohio. It currently consists of the 1st Battalion, 148th Infantry Regiment, an infantry battalion of the 37th Infantry Brigade Combat Team located throughout northwest Ohio.

The regiment was formed on 15 September 1917 with the redesignation of the 3rd Regiment, Ohio Volunteer Infantry, as part of the 74th Brigade, 37th Infantry Division.

Mission
The 1-148th Infantry Battalion of the Ohio Army National Guard has the Federal Mission to close with the enemy by means of fire and maneuver in order to destroy or capture them or repel their assault by fire, close combat, and counterattack. The State Mission of the Battalion is to provide units trained and equipped for immediate deployment in support of natural disasters and civil disturbances within the state of Ohio and as an aid to civil authorities for domestic disaster preparedness and emergency response, and aid to civil authorities.

Organization
The 1st Battalion, 148th Infantry Regiment, Ohio Army National Guard, is part of the 37th Infantry Brigade Combat Team, Columbus, Ohio. The 1-148th Infantry Battalion is composed of five assigned units: Headquarters and Headquarters Company, Walbridge, Ohio; Company A, Walbridge, Ohio; Company B, Bowling Green, Ohio; Company C, Tiffin, Ohio; Company D, Sandusky, Ohio; and one attached unit, Company G, 237th Brigade Support Battalion, Lima, Ohio.

Most soldiers are on traditional reserve status who serve in the military on a part-time basis, taking time out from their families and civilian jobs to participate one weekend a month as well as two weeks of annual training each year. Since then the 148th Infantry Battalion has been redesignated, deactivated, and reactivated many times. Each of the units that made up the 148th Infantry left a record of distinguished achievements.

History
The 148th Infantry Regiment has participated in many military actions including: Mexican War, Civil War, Spanish–American War. World War I and World War II. The 148th Infantry Regiment received the Presidential Unit Citation (Army), Philippine Presidential Unit Citation, and cited in the Order of the Day of the Belgian Army. The 148th Infantry also received the Joint Services Meritorious Unit Award for its participation in the 1996 Atlanta Olympics Detail. Seven individuals in the 148th have distinguished themselves with the Medal of Honor.

Formation
The 148th Infantry Regiment was designated in June 1846 at Camp Washington, OH, as the 2nd Regiment, Ohio Volunteer Infantry. The years of the Civil War brought several antecedents of the 148th Infantry, namely the 2nd and the 6th Ohio Volunteer Regiments. The 16th Infantry Regiment was formed in the area of Ohio now being served by the 148th Infantry. 1898 saw the 16th Regiment back on active duty as the 6th Ohio and moving once again to the deep South and within a year was moving by foot, rail and ship to Cienfuegos, Cuba and Trinidad. In the years following, men from the 2nd and 6th Ohio Regiments served in the Philippine insurrection and the Boxer uprising, and in such peacetime service as at Dayton during the catastrophic flood of 1913.

1916 and Pancho Villa
The year 1916 brought Pancho Villa's raid on Columbus, New Mexico. On 14 July 1916, the 3rd Infantry, Ohio National Guard, direct predecessor of the 148th Infantry, was mustered into federal service and rushed to duty on the Mexican border at El Paso, Texas. There, the Guardsmen received the training which was soon to be put to its most severe test to date. Several units were never mustered out of service from border duty but were sent directly to camps for additional training. It was on 15 September 1917 that the 3rd Ohio was redesignated the 148th Infantry, 74th Brigade, 37th Infantry Division.

1917 and WWI
During World War I, in the front lines at Baccarat and the Pannes, in the Meuse-Argonne and Ypres-Lys offenses at Recicourt and Avocourt, men of the 148th fought in the three strenuous months which were to bring victory to the allied troops. It was the Ypres-Lys campaign that saw the crowning achievement of the 148th. There the Regiment, first of all the allied troops, crossed the Scheldt River in Belgium on 2 November 1918 and maintained the crossing in spite of heavy losses from devastating machine gun and shell fire. It was there, too, that the regimental motto, "We'll do it," was inspired.

Among the more distinguished members of the 148th was Pvt. Wilk Gunckle, Company M, 148th Infantry, recipient of the Distinguished Service Cross for his extraordinary heroism near Heurne, Belgium on 3 November 1918.  According to the postwar attestation by the Adjutant-General, "He volunteered and guided ammunition carriers to advanced positions, despite the fact that he was seriously wounded in the face, which made it necessary to hold a bandage in place during the journey to and from the front. After receiving treatment at the first-aid station he returned to his duties."

With the signing of the Armistice, the 148th stayed on in Europe for several months before it returned to the United States and was demobilized. 1 July 1921 the 148th Infantry was reorganized as such. It was on 27 September 1923 that the 148th Infantry regimental insignia was approved – the first in the United States to receive official War Department sanction.

The crest has seventeen (17) silver arrows, banded by a sprig of buckeye on a wreath of blue and gold, which are the regimental colors. The seventeen arrows signify Ohio, which was the seventeenth state to be admitted to the Union. The shield is azure, for infantry, divided by a red fess, bordered by two gold bands with two fleurs-de-lis representing the offensive and defensive actions in which the Regiment participated in France. The lion represents Belgium, where the Regiment engaged in the Ypres-Lys offensive. The red fess, wavy and bordered by the two gold bands, represents the Scheldt River which, of all the allied troops, was crossed first by the 148th Infantry on 2 November 1918. The regimental motto, "We'll Do It," inscribed below the shield was inspired during this crossing and became a battle cry that inspired the members of this Regiment to rise above the normal call of duty and to go on to soundly defeat an enemy of superior numbers and to bring about a great victory for the allies.

The interwar years
The years 1921 to 1940 constituted a period of rebuilding and peacetime service. The 148th was called to duty at Sandusky following a destructive tornado in 1924 and at Cincinnati during the disastrous flood of 1937. The Guard of Honor at the funeral for President Warren G. Harding included men of the 148th. When strikes taxed the efforts of civilian authorities, the 148th was called to help maintain peace and protect property.

WWII
15 October 1940 found the 148th Infantry, as part of the 37th Division, back in active federal service and training in the deep South at Camp Shelby. Shortly after its arrival at its training station, the 148th received a large number of selective service personnel and started a long training program designed to make it one of the finest fighting units in the U.S. Army. After 16 months of rigorous training, the unit moved to Indiantown Gap and finished off its pre-embarkation training designed for European service. With the Japanese sweeping to seemingly easy victories against undermanned Pacific defenses, the 37th was rushed to the Islands to set up a series of island defenses designed to stop the advances and island hopping of the Japanese. The 148th landed at Suva, Fiji Islands, in early June 1942 and immediately set up a long coastal defense on the western part of Viti Levu. This program, coupled with vigorous jungle training, fitted the 148th for its baptism of fire on New Georgia. July 1943 found the 148th under command of Col. Stuart A. Baxter fighting the best Japanese had to offer in the battle for Munda airstrip. It took only one campaign and the veterans of the 148th could be proud of this new fighting unit. Lt. Col. (now Brig. Gen.) Delbert Schultz took the 3rd Battalion on a special mission with a Marine raider force and hit the Japanese at Bairoko Harbor and fought their way through some of the toughest terrain in the Solomon Islands to tie up with the remainder of the 148th in the final push for the airstrip.

After but a brief rest unloading ships at Guadalcanal, the 148th was again to lead the way for the 37th and follow the 3rd Marine Division into Bougainville. Once the perimeter defenses were set, it was a matter of marking time until the Japanese 6th Division hit. Early March 1944 found them doing just that, making a penetration of the 145th lines near Hill 700. The 2nd Battalion, under the command of Lt. Col. (now Col.) Herbert W. Radcliffe, was ordered to counter-attack and drive the Japanese from the Hill. After a brief but bloody battle, the 2nd Battalion restored the lines. Within a week the 2nd Battalion again was called upon to back up the 129th Infantry in its sector. For their heroic and courageous efforts, three units of the 148th Infantry received the Presidential Unit Citation.

January 1945 saw the 148th pushing ashore at Lingayen Gulf, Luzon Island, and heading toward Manila. To the veterans of the 148th, there can be no doubt as to which unit reached Manila first. Along the way such strongholds as Clark Field, Fort Stotensburg and Santa Tomas had to be neutralized. Following the fall of Manila, the 148th pushed on toward Balete Pass and thence onward to Baguio and the fall of the summer capital. Before the 148th could catch their breath they were on the move again, this time up through the Cagayen Valley and moving toward Aparri before the Japanese finally surrendered.

Post WWII
From September to December 1945, the 148th performed occupational tasks in Luzon before they returned to the United States. Once more a job of reorganization followed the deactivation of the 37th Division back in Ohio. 15 January 1952 found the 148th back in the deep South, this time at Camp Polk, LA.
The 148th Regiment was reorganized 1 April 1963 to consist only of the 1st Battalion, 148th Infantry (written 1-148th) an element of the 37th Infantry Division.

11 September 2001
After 11 September 2001, A-D Companies of the 1-148 Infantry activated to federal active duty on 6 October 2001 and shipped to Ft. Knox, KY, for mobilization training and validation. HHC and E Companies soon followed, and activated to federal active duty on 15 October 2001. Prior to moving to Ft. Knox, KY, the battalion headquarters set up shop at Rickenbacker National Guard Base in Columbus, Ohio, from 24 September to 8 October 2001, in order to provide command and control over the mobilization. As of early 2002, the 148th Infantry was standing guard over American federal installations on its home soil, across the Mid-West region of the United States, in support of Operation Noble Eagle.

Mission to Kosovo
Under the command of Task Force Shield Commander Lieutenant Colonel Gordon L. Ellis. The 1-148th Infantry, Ohio Army National Guard was mobilized in June 2004 for four months of training prior to a six-month deployment to Kosovo as peacekeepers as part of Operation Joint Guardian rotation KFOR-6A. for the assignment on the NATO-led peacekeeping force in Kosovo. The soldiers trained for 3 months at Camp Atterbury, IN and then one month at Hohenfels, Bavaria, Germany. The soldiers arrived in Kosovo in August 2004 beginning their mission stationed at Camp Monteith, and Camp Bondsteel, in the MNB-East (Multi National Brigade) sector and returned in February 2005.

Hurricane Katrina
As part of Task Force Buckeye, under the Command of Lieutenant Colonel Gordon L. Ellis. The 1-148th Infantry, Ohio Army National Guard was mobilized on 30 August 2005 and sent to New Orleans, LA. for Hurricane Katrina relief.  The 1-148th IN was assigned to the Super Dome in order to install stability and facilitate the evacuation of all civilians. They returned in late September 2005.

Operation Iraqi Freedom 
The 1-148th was deployed in support of Operation Iraqi Freedom (OIF) 2007–2008. They were mobilized in January 2008 and trained for three months at Fort Hood TX, then they were sent to Camp Arifjan Kuwait and conducted convoy security and escort operations throughout Iraq and Kuwait. They returned in December 2008.

Operation Enduring Freedom

The 1-148th received notification in May 2010 of a deployment to Afghanistan in the fall of 2011. They mobilized in Camp Shelby Mississippi and conducted training to prepare for deployment to RC-North Afghanistan in support of Operation Enduring Freedom.

Missions in Afghanistan 
The 1-148th Infantry Regiment conducted two main mission while deployed to Afghanistan:  

1.) Reaper Company(HHC), Apache Company(A Co) and Comanche Company(C Co) would occupy Forward Operating Base Griffin in Maimana and Combat Outpost Quasar and Combat Outpost Ghormach to conduct Security Force Assistance Teams missions, BDOC(Base Defense Operations), Security Detail for the Battalion Commander's Key Leader Engagements, and QRF (Quick Reaction Force).  

2.) Bravo Company and Delta Company were assigned to the NTM-A mission Task Force ROC conducting missions throughout Afghanistan.

Casualties 
Reaper Company occupied FOB Griffin with two platoons and a small headquarters element. On April 4th, 2012 First Platoon HHC 1-148 was attacked with an SVBIED (Suicide Borne Improvised Explosive Device) while on mission in the city of Maimana. The Platoon sergeant and two other soldiers were KIA. 5 soldiers WIA. The explosion caused over 30 casualties. 

Comanche Company occupied COP Ghormach the furthest outpost away from FOB Griffin. During an attack on the combat outpost 2 soldiers were WIA due to smalls arms fire.

Unit Awards 
HHC, A Co, and C Co 1-148th Infantry Regiment were each awarded a Meritorious Unit Citation in support of Operation Enduring Freedom. The 1-148th returned to Camp Shelby Mississippi fall of 2012 to demobilize.

Additional Deployment 
The 1-148th was mobilized in 2017 and conducted pre-deployment training at Fort Bliss, TX. The Battalion subsequently deployed for nine months to Jordan in support of Operation Enduring Freedom (Spartan Shield).

Heraldry

Coat of arms

Heraldic description
Shield: Azure, a fess wavy Gules fimbriated Or, between two fleurs-de-lis in chief and a rampant lion in base of the last.
Crest: From a wreath Or and Azure, a sheaf of seventeen arrows Argent, bound by a sprig of buckeye (aesculus glabra) fructed Proper (two leaves bursting burr).
Motto: WE'LL DO IT

Symbolism
The shield is blue for Infantry divided by a wavy fess of red, bordered by two gold bands, representing the Escaut River in Belgium, which the Regiment, under heavy fire, was the first of the Allied Troops to cross during World War I, costing the lives of many men, but held in the face of concentrated artillery fire and in the face of counterattacks. Two gold fleurs-de-lis, taken from the ancient French Arms denote service in France, the holding of two sectors in that country, the gold lion rampant is taken from the arms of Belgium and denotes service in that country in the Ypres-Lys offensive. At the time of the crossing of the Escaut River, the units attempting the act were just a little doubtful as to how a swift river could be crossed without pontoons. Lieutenant Colonel Marlin, then Major Marlin, reminded them of a certain ceremony that was to be performed on reaching the Rhine, and with the catch phrase "We'll Do It," the soldiers fell to work, cut down a tree across the Escaut and crossed, single file, over the tree.

Background
The coat of arms was approved on 21 April 1923.

See also
 3rd Ohio Infantry

References

External links
Ohio National Guard homepage
U.S. Army Institute of Heraldry page for 148th Infantry Regiment, Ohio Army National Guard

Infantry regiments of the United States Army National Guard
Military units and formations established in 1917
Ohio Army National Guard
Ohio National Guard units
Military units and formations of the United States in the War on Terror
148